Egypt Station is the 17th solo studio album by English singer-songwriter Paul McCartney, released on 7 September 2018 through Capitol Records.

Egypt Station was produced by Greg Kurstin and co-produced by McCartney, with the exception of one track produced by Ryan Tedder. The album is McCartney's first studio release since 2013's New. The album's first (double A-side) single, consisting of the two songs "I Don't Know" and "Come On to Me", was released on 20 June 2018.

The name "Egypt Station" is shared by one of McCartney's paintings from 1988, from which the cover art is derived. It became his first number one album in the United States since 1982's Tug of War and his first to debut atop the Billboard 200.

Recording
Egypt Station was recorded in studios in Los Angeles, London, São Paulo, and Sussex. McCartney began working with producer Greg Kurstin some time after the release of his 2013 album New and mentioned their working together several times leading up to the 20 June 2018 announcement of Egypt Stations release.

McCartney also wrote and recorded three songs with Ryan Tedder. Two of the songs, "Fuh You" and "Nothing for Free", were released on the album. The song "Get Enough" was also recorded with Tedder for the album, but was instead released New Year's Day 2019 as a non-album single.

The song "Back in Brazil" was recorded at KLB Studios in the city of São Paulo.

Composition
Egypt Station contains 16 tracks, including opening and penultimate ambient pieces entitled "Opening Station" and "Station II", respectively. Tracks include the singles "I Don't Know" and "Come On to Me". "Happy with You" is described as "acoustic meditation on present day contentedness," "People Want Peace" is called a "timeless anthem that would fit on virtually any album of any McCartney era", and "Despite Repeated Warnings" is called "an epic multi-movement closer".

On the inspiration for the album's title and theme, McCartney said:

"I liked the words 'Egypt Station.' It reminded me of the 'album' albums we used to make. ... 'Egypt Station' starts off at the station on the first song, and then each song is like a different station. So it gave us some idea to base all the songs around that. I think of it as a dream location that the music emanates from."

In the promotional event "Casual Conversation," McCartney further clarified his creative process behind recording Egypt Station and described it as a loose concept album.

Promotion

On 10 June 2018, all content was removed from McCartney's Instagram page. That day, all of McCartney's social media pages began posting cryptic photos of symbols and McCartney playing various instruments, fueling speculation of an impending announcement. The title Egypt Station was first announced on 18 June 2018, McCartney's 76th birthday. One day later, McCartney officially announced the release of the album's first (double A-side) single, consisting of the two songs "I Don't Know" and "Come On to Me". The two songs were released on 20 June 2018. The same day, McCartney's website officially announced the title and release date of Egypt Station, also providing information on the album's recording and creative process.

McCartney agreed to film a "Carpool Karaoke" segment for The Late Late Show with James Corden in Liverpool on 9 June 2018. As part of the segment, McCartney played a small gig at Liverpool's Philharmonic Dining Rooms, where he performed "Come On to Me" live for the first time. The segment was broadcast the week of 17 June 2018 in conjunction with the release of the album's first single. An extended version of the segment, titled "When Corden Met McCartney (Live from Liverpool)", was broadcast by CBS on 20 August 2018.

On 3 July 2018, the Freshen Up tour was announced through the official McCartney website. The tour started on 17 September 2018 in Quebec City, Canada.

On 19 July 2018, McCartney posted an image on his Instagram asking fans, "Why do you think you should attend a secret event in London with Paul next week"? Fans were asked to "post a short video using the hashtag #UnderTheStaircase". The winners of the contest were treated to a secret concert at Abbey Road Studios with a number of other celebrity guests in attendance. The set list included four songs from the upcoming album, including "Come On to Me" and the live debuts of "Confidante", "Fuh You", and a song that had been previously unmentioned, called "Who Cares". Later the same week, McCartney played a surprise concert at The Cavern Club in Liverpool.

On 25 July 2018, McCartney held a talk titled "Casual Conversation" at the Liverpool Institute for Performing Arts (LIPA). Moderated by Jarvis Cocker, the event was live-streamed on Facebook, and he answered questions from LIPA students as well as viewers online.

On 15 August 2018, McCartney released "Fuh You" as the second single from the album. On 3 September 2018, McCartney's YouTube channel released a series of videos titled "Egypt Station – Words Between the Tracks". The videos feature McCartney briefly describing the composition and inspiration of each track from the standard edition album.

On 7 September 2018, to celebrate the launch of the album, McCartney performed a "secret" concert at Grand Central Terminal that was live-streamed on YouTube. Music only videos of each performance were later uploaded to his YouTube channel.

During the lead-up promotion to the album's release date, lyric videos were released on YouTube for the first singles "Come On To Me", "I Don't Know", and "Fuh You". Since Egypt Stations release, official music videos were released for "Fuh You", "Back In Brazil" and "Come On To Me". The music videos are a creative departure from many of McCartney's previous music videos in that they each focus on the lives of ordinary people with McCartney only appearing briefly (on stage) in the conclusion of "Back In Brazil".

Critical reception

Egypt Station has been well received by music critics. On Metacritic, the album has an overall score of 74 out of 100 compiled from the scores of 25 music critics, indicating "generally favourable reviews".

In the review for AllMusic, Stephen Thomas Erlewine opined that "all the slower songs are peppered with haunting images of darkness creeping at the edges, while McCartney revives the carnality that marked 'Press' – not just on the straightforward 'Fuh You,' but 'Come on to Me,' a considerably better song than the Tedder exercise. Such twists are welcome, but what's satisfying about Egypt Station is what's always satisfying about a McCartney record: the hooks and imagination that are so rampant they seem effortless." Dan Stubbs from NME gave the album 4 out of 5 stars, saying, "McCartney’s always been about inclusivity and openness, but this latest glimpse into his life feels like a particularly enlightening one." Reviewing the album for The Observer, Kitty Empire also gave the album 4 out of 5 stars. In the review she states that "the finest songs here land immediately and hum with urgency."

Writing a four-star review in Rolling Stone, Rob Sheffield claimed, "Make a list of all the songwriters who were composing great tunes in 1958. Now make an overlapping list of the ones who are still writing brilliant songs in 2018. Your list reads: Paul McCartney." Chris Willman at Variety stated, "If it doesn't make for McCartney's most coherent collection, it's endearing how enthusiastically he strives, at 76, to avoid doing just one thing when he can do a dozen. Bitch, he's Macca."

In 2019, Egypt Station was nominated for the Fryderyk Music Award (in Poland) for the best foreign album of 2018, but did not win, losing the award to Anthem of the Peaceful Army by Greta Van Fleet.

Commercial performance
Egypt Station debuted at number one on the US Billboard 200 in the issue dated 22 September 2018, earning 153,000 album equivalent units (of which 147,000 were pure album sales). It is McCartney's first US number one album since Tug of War in 1982, as well as his eighth number one album overall and his first to debut atop the chart. The album dropped to number eight in its second week, earning an additional 37,000 album-equivalent units in the United States.

Track listing
All tracks produced by Greg Kurstin and McCartney, except "Fuh You" by Ryan Tedder and McCartney, "Nothing for Free" and "Get Enough" by Ryan Tedder, Zach Skelton and McCartney.

Personnel
 Paul McCartney – lead and backing vocals (2–14, 16), acoustic guitar (2–5, 7–14, 16), keyboards (2–4, 6–14, 16), bass guitar (2, 4–8, 10–14, 16), percussion (2, 3, 8, 10, 11, 13, 14, 16), drums (2, 8, 10, 12–14, 16), electric guitar (3, 8, 10, 11, 14, 16), harmonica (3), tape loops (10), co-productionwith'

 Greg Kurstin – production, engineering, arrangements, keyboards (2, 4, 8, 11, 14), electric guitar (2, 3), mellotron (2), percussion (3, 12), backing vocal (8), marimba (10), sound effects (11), vibraphone (16)
 Rob Millett – cimbalom (2, 4, 10)
 Wix Wickens – keyboards (3, 5, 13, 14)
 Abe Laboriel Jr. – drums (3, 5, 11, 13, 14), percussion (4, 12, 16), tack piano (4), backing vocals (5, 11–14, 16)
 Rusty Anderson – electric guitar (3, 5, 12–14, 16), backing vocals (5, 12–14, 16), acoustic guitar (14)
 Brian Ray – electric guitar (3, 5, 13, 14, 16), bass guitar (3), backing vocals (5, 13, 14, 16), acoustic guitar (14)
 Tim Loo – cello (3, 16)
 Greg Phillinganes – piano (3)
 Pedro Eustache – flute (4, 9, 11), duduk (11)
 Ryan Tedder – backing vocals (6), programming (6), co-production (6)
 Zach Skelton – programming (6), co-production (6)
 Inara George, Alex Pasco, Matt Tuggle, Collin Kadlec – backing vocals (8)
 Vanessa Freebairn-Smith – cello (8, 9)
 Jodi Burnett – cello (9)
 Caroline Le'gene, Roy Bennett – backing vocals (13)
 Julian Burg – backing vocal (8), engineering
 Session musicians – orchestration and choir (1–4, 6, 11, 12, 14–16)
 Mark "Spike" Stent – mixing
 Steve Orchard, Mauricio Cersosimo, Al Schmitt, Billy Bush, Rich Rich, Alex Pasco – engineering

Charts

Weekly charts

Year-end charts

Certifications

References

External links

2018 albums
Paul McCartney albums
Capitol Records albums
Albums produced by Greg Kurstin
Albums produced by Paul McCartney
Albums produced by Ryan Tedder
Albums recorded at A&M Studios
Concept albums